The Olympus XA was a series of 35 mm cameras manufactured and marketed by Olympus of Japan. The original XA was a rangefinder camera with a fast 35 mm f/2.8 lens, and aperture priority metering. It was one of the smallest rangefinder cameras ever made, together with the Contax T. Later models—XA2, XA3 and XA4—featured scale focusing instead of rangefinders.

History
It was designed by Yoshihisa Maitani who had joined Olympus Optical Co Ltd in 1956. He was the chief camera designer and managing director of Olympus Optical Co Ltd., having developed a number of legendary cameras during his career. These included the Pen series, the OM series, the XA series, the IS series and the [mju:] series of cameras. 

The original model, the XA, was sold from 1979 to 1985.

Models
 Olympus XA: small rangefinder with aperture priority 35mm f/2.8 lens
 Olympus XA1: simple mechanical camera with a selenium meter
 Olympus XA2: scale focus camera, automatic shutter 35mm f/3.5 lens
 Olympus XA3: Same as XA2 with "DX" automatic film speed recognition 
 Olympus XA4: distance focus camera, 28mm wide macro lens

The original XA's lens was protected by a sliding dust cover. Film wind is by thumb-wheel, aperture is set on the right side of the body using a small lever, focus is set by a small lever below the lens, film speed (ISO) is set on a dial below the lens, the viewfinder is optical direct-view with the rangefinder frame embedded in it and a display of the shutter speed at the side. There was also a small lever on the camera's base which when flipped out, added 1 1/2 stops exposure to the shutter speed. This could be used to counteract the effects of subject back lighting.

The XA1 used a fixed-focus lens. Although the cameras resembled each other, there were subtle differences in design. The XA3 and XA4 were slightly larger than the XA and XA2. The original XA's dust cover dome resembled a flattened oval, whereas the other models had a more rounded design. Each of these substituted focusing distance for the right-side lever for the aperture-control of the original XA. As a result these cameras were automatic program only, whereas the original XA was an aperture-priority camera.

Accessories
The XA series was accompanied by a range of detachable flash units. The standard A11 took one AA battery and had a guide number of 10. The A16 took two batteries and had a guide number of 16. The A9M and A1L were smaller units for the XA1 and XA4 respectively.

Specifications

References

External links 

 Casual Photophile - User Review of the Olympus XA
 Diaxa website - gives model details and opinions
 

XA
135 film cameras